The 1978 Cal State Fullerton Titans football team represented California State University, Fullerton as a member of the Pacific Coast Athletic Association (PCAA) during the 1978 NCAA Division I-A football season. Led by fourth-year head coach Jim Colletto, Cal State Fullerton compiled an overall record 5–7 with a mark of 2–2 in conference play, placing fourth in the PCAA. The Titans played home games at Falcon Stadium on the campus of Cerritos College in Norwalk, California.

Schedule

Team players in the NFL
No Cal State Fullerton Titans were selected in the 1979 NFL Draft.

The following finished their college career in 1978, were not drafted, but played in the NFL.

References

Cal State Fullerton
Cal State Fullerton Titans football seasons
Cal State Fullerton Titans football